Chris Milk is an American entrepreneur, innovator, director, photographer, and immersive artist. He is co-founder and CEO of Within (Virtual Reality) (formerly Vrse), a virtual reality technology company, and co-founder of Here Be Dragons (formerly Vrse.works), a virtual reality production company. Milk began his career directing music videos and commercials for leading artists and brands, and in subsequent years became best known for bridging the gap between emerging technologies and new mediums for storytelling.

Milk's work has been exhibited in museums worldwide, including the Museum of Modern Art in New York, the Tate Modern in London, the Barbican Centre in London, Cent Quatre in Paris, and the Ullens Center for Contemporary Art in Beijing. Milk has been honored twice with the Grand Prix Cannes Lions, the D&AD Black Pencil, the Grand Clio, and SXSW's 'Best of Show' alongside multiple Grammy nominations, MTV Moon Men, and the UK MVA Innovation Award.

Milk was named one of WIRED's 100 Most Influential People in 2016, one of The Hollywood Reporter's L.A.'s 25 Most Powerful Digital Players in 2016, Adweeks Creative 100 list in 2015, as one of the 50 Most Creative People by Advertising Age in 2011 and 2015, and one of the "100 Most Creative People in Business" by Fast Company in 2012. Milk presented at TED in 2015 on the power of virtual reality as a medium to advance humanity, and again in 2016 on the birth of virtual reality as a new art form.

Early life 
Milk was born in Glen Cove, New York. After attending Friends Academy High School, Milk studied Music and Film at the University of California, Santa Barbara, and then earned a B.F.A. in Film, Photography and Computer Graphics at the Academy of Art University in San Francisco, California.

Career

Music videos, commercials, short films and interactive 
Milk began his career directing music videos and commercials for artists and brands including Arcade Fire, U2, Kanye West, Green Day, Johnny Cash, Gnarls Barkley, The Chemical Brothers, John Mellencamp, Courtney Love, Modest Mouse, Nike, O2, Chevy and Nintendo.

Milk's collaboration with Kanye West on the single "All Falls Down" was shot entirely in first person perspective, a technique he utilized again in a commercial for O2's "Can Do" campaign and his short film "The Last Day Dream", signaling his future affinity for virtual reality and subjective storytelling. Milk collaborated again with Kanye West on the video for "Touch The Sky", which was in part an homage to Evel Knievel, a childhood hero of Milk's.

Milk's collaboration with Arcade Fire, Aaron Koblin and Google Creative Lab on "The Wilderness Downtown" in 2010 was one of his first interactive videos that utilized emerging technologies to create new, more personal ways for viewers to connect with digital experiences. The browser based video uses HTML5, satellite imagery and Google Street View to incorporate images from a viewer's childhood home mixed with digital footage and CGI elements. At the end of the video, viewers are encouraged to write a postcard to their younger selves. "The Wilderness Downtown" was named as one of Times 30 Best Music Videos of all time, saying, "It’s the first video that truly harnesses the digital age — and one of the most personal you’ll ever watch." It was also was exhibited at MoMA in New York in 2011.

Also in 2010, Milk created "The Johnny Cash Project", a collaboration with Aaron Koblin set to the Johnny Cash song "Ain't No Grave". In the interactive music video, users can submit drawn frames to be curated into an animated short film built upon a myriad of frames submitted by different users. As a result, the video constantly evolves and can be arranged by a set of various criteria. Users can elect to view the highest rated frames, or all frames that are done in a pointillist or abstract style, for example. NPR suggested that the digital experience allowed fans to connect with Cash posthumously.

In 2011, Milk collaborated again with Aaron Koblin and Google Creative Lab on the interactive short film "3 Dreams of Black" based on the track of the same name from the Danger Mouse album Rome, which features Daniele Luppi, Jack White and Norah Jones. Here, Milk used WebGL to turn a user's web browser into a canvas for creating 3D objects within an interactive, CGI setting. When viewing the film, which is also told from first person perspective, users can control the vantage point with the use of their mouse. As the user's mouse hovers over the browser window playing the film, 3D objects appear and proliferate within the world of the film. Users can create additional 3D objects to add to the film within the film's website.

In 2008, Milk directed Second Unit for "A Mother's Promise", the film that introduced Barack Obama at the Democratic National Convention.

Immersive installations 

Milk collaborated with Arcade Fire, ESKI and Moment Factory in 2011 to create an interactive experience called "Summer Into Dust" for concert goers at the closing of the 2011 Coachella Music Festival. During Arcade Fire's final song, "Wake Up", cascades of beach balls were released onto the crowd. Milk and his team had fit LEDs and IR transmitters into each ball to light paint kaleidoscopic patterns across the audience. The balls physically connected the audience with the band and their performance, and the moment has been widely credited as the highlight of the festival.

In 2012, Milk created "The Treachery of Sanctuary", an interactive immersive art installation currently touring the world with The Creators Project. It is a large-scale interactive installation that utilizes the Microsoft Kinect to project and manipulate a participant's shadow onto a triptych. In the first panel, shadows of birds congregate to form the participant's shadow. In the second panel, the participant's shadow is torn apart by the birds. In the third, the participant's shadow sprouts wings, allowing the shadow to fly out of the frame as the participant flaps their arms. The triptych created a cycle that according to Milk interprets the universal human experience of birth, death and transfiguration. "The Treachery of Sanctuary" was exhibited at the Onassis Cultural center in Greece, and was selected to be a part of the Sundance Film Festival's New Frontier exhibition in January 2016.

Also in 2012, Milk collaborated with Aaron Koblin to create "The Exquisite Forest", a collaborative online experience that allows participants to create branching animated narratives. In the piece, a series of trees represent a series of narratives, each beginning with the seed of an initial animation. As participants create new animations to add to the narrative, the animated trees branch out, creating a representation of the multiple narratives spawned by user input. The piece was exhibited at the Tate Modern in London between 2012 and 2013.

Virtual reality 

Milk's first virtual reality production was a collaboration with musical artist Beck entitled "Sound and Vision". The project was initially released online, giving viewers the choice to watch Beck perform from the vantage point of different 360 degree cameras, and further allowed viewers to use their computer's mouse to change their viewing perspective. Milk invented a binaural audio recording instrument in order to capture sound in a 3D environment to mimic real life human experience. The result allows the audio to shift perspective in accordance with what the viewer is seeing, creating a natural virtual experience for the audience member. In the tradition of his work on "The Wilderness Downtown" and Rome, Milk utilized modern technologies to further expand the viewing experience: viewers could enable their computer's webcam to shift the perspective of the 360 video up, down, left and right with the tilt of their head.

In 2014, Milk and Aaron Koblin founded Within (Virtual Reality) (formerly Vrse), a virtual reality technology company and sister company Vrse.works. Within is a leading virtual reality company that builds the technology to create and distribute the most innovative human stories in virtual reality. Sister company Here Be Dragons (formerly Vrse.works) has partnered with top talent in film and television and represents a world class roster of directors for virtual reality content creation. The company has already produced award-winning immersive content including Clouds Over Sidra with the United Nations, and work with The New York Times, Vice, NBC, and Nike. Vrse.farm is working in partnership with Megan Ellison's Annapurna Pictures to develop original cinematic work in virtual reality. The Within app is currently available on iOS and Android, works with Google Cardboard and Samsung Gear VR, and will be available on the Oculus Rift, PlayStation VR and HTC Vive when they are released to the public in 2016.

Virtual reality projects 
Through Within and Vrse.works, Milk has explored Virtual Reality as a means to tell documentaries, narratives, and share live experiences.

In December 2014, Milk and Spike Jonze captured the Millions March in New York, which protested police brutality for Vice News. Milk launched the Within app platform at the 2015 Sundance Film Festival in addition to "Evolution of Verse", a photo-realistic CGI-rendered 3-D virtual reality film, and "Clouds Over Sidra", a virtual reality documentary made in partnership with the United Nations which follows a 12-year-old girl's life in a Syrian refugee camp. After the Sundance launch, Vrse.works captured Saturday Night Live’s 40th Anniversary special in VR. Milk created "Walking New York" with Zach Richter, a VR experience made in partnership with The New York Times which follows French artist JR and his making of a 150-foot-tall portrait of a recent immigrant to NYC that was wheat pasted across the Flatiron Building Pedestrian Plaza for less than 24 hours. Vrse.works recently partnered again with the United Nations to create the VR experience Waves of Grace. The film transports viewers to West Point, the most populous slum in the capital of Liberia, and follows the experience of Decontee Davis, an Ebola survivor who uses her immunity to help others affected by the disease. Most recently, Milk and his team have released music videos for U2 and Muse in partnership with Apple Music. In the video for U2’s "Song for Someone," singers from around the world sing alongside U2 within the virtual environment. In Muse’s "Revolt," viewers watch from the point of view of multiple drones as the music spawns a revolution.

Videography

Music videos

2015
 U2 - "Song for Someone"
2013
 Beck - "Sound and Vision"
2011
 Rome  - "3 Dreams of Black"
 Rome - "Two Against One"
2010
 Arcade Fire  - "We Used to Wait/The Wilderness Downtown"
 Johnny Cash  - "Ain't No Grave/The Johnny Cash Project"
2008
 Gnarls Barkley  - "Who's Gonna Save My Soul"
2006
 Kanye West featuring Lupe Fiasco - "Touch the Sky"
 Gnarls Barkley - "Gone Daddy Gone"
 U2 & Green Day - "The Saints Are Coming"
2005
 Natasha Bedingfield - "These Words" (North American Version – Boom Boxes)
 Audioslave - "Doesn't Remind Me"
2004
 Courtney Love - "Mono"
 Kanye West featuring Syleena Johnson - "All Falls Down"
 Kanye West - "Jesus Walks" (Version 2 – Chain Gang/KKK Burning Cross)
 Jet - "Rollover DJ"
 Modest Mouse - "Ocean Breathes Salty"
 John Mellencamp - "Walk Tall"
2003
 The Chemical Brothers featuring The Flaming Lips - "The Golden Path"

Television commercials
2007
 Nike "Monument", "Practice", "Grundle", "Leaving", "Passion", "Nicknames"
2006
 L.L.Bean "Testing for Life", "Mt. Washington", "The Search"

2004

 UPN Safe Sex PSA "Jimmy & Stiffy"

2003

 Philips "Vinyl", "Walking the Dog"

2002

 Nintendo GameCube "Rush Holiday"

2001
 Nintendo Paper Mario "CutOut"
2000
 Telstra "Betty (Greyhounds)" 
1999
 3DO BattleTanx: Global Assault "The Six Million Dollar Bear"
 Terminate "Vendomatic"
year unknown

 Sprite "Extreme Is Dead" (spec ad)
Calve "Gas Station"
 CA Energy Conservation "Supermarket"

Personal life
Of his practice of Transcendental Meditation Milk said in 2016, "There’s a really transcendental quality to virtual reality. ... TM is a really great portal into exploring those states within yourself. Virtual reality is basically an authored dream state."

References

External links
 milk.co
 Vrse
 Vrse.works
 

1970s births
Living people
Academy of Art University alumni
American music video directors
American photographers
Film directors from California
People from Glen Cove, New York
Film directors from New York (state)
Advertising directors